Itzacon Eire, more popularly known as Itzacon, is the premier gaming convention run by the Fantasy and Science Fiction Society (Fansci) of NUI Galway, Ireland.

History
Itzacon Eire was founded in 2005 by Anita Murray, then auditor of the society. As of 2019 it has been run for fifteen years.

In 2007 the National Game Writers Award was for role-playing game and LARP writers who have shown a continued dedication to the Irish convention scene and have produced material of noted quality for Itzacon Eire.

Convention directors

National Game Writer Award winners

Intervarsity Boardgames Trophy winners

References

Clubs and societies in the Republic of Ireland
Annual events in Ireland
Irish culture
2005 establishments in Ireland
Recurring events established in 2005